Brigitta Stenberg is a film and television actress, active primarily in the 1990s.

Stenberg had supporting roles in action films such as Rapid Fire and Raiders of the Sun.  She also appeared in several episodes of the TV drama MacGyver.

Her most recent credit of note was a part in the 1999 feature Five Aces.

Filmography

External links

American film actresses
American television actresses
Year of birth missing (living people)
Living people
21st-century American women